Adam Resnick is an American comedy writer from Harrisburg, Pennsylvania. He is best known for his work writing for Late Night with David Letterman.

He co-created and wrote for Get A Life with Chris Elliott. Resnick also wrote and was co-executive producer of a season of The Larry Sanders Show for HBO. He created and wrote The High Life (1996), also for HBO. Also for television, he has written for Saturday Night Live, and is a writer and consulting producer on Divorce.

Resnick has also written for film. With its star, Chris Elliott, Resnick created the story for the 1994 motion picture Cabin Boy, for which he wrote the screenplay. Resnick wrote the screenplays for  Lucky Numbers (2000), starring John Travolta and Lisa Kudrow, and Death to Smoochy (2002), directed by Danny DeVito.

Will Not Attend, a pseudo-memoir, was released in 2014. Kirkus Reviews called the book "a neurotic, unapologetic, hilarious collection."

References

External links
 
 NY Times Review 2000

Living people
American television writers
Film producers from Pennsylvania
American male screenwriters
Emmy Award winners
Writers from Harrisburg, Pennsylvania
Year of birth missing (living people)
American male television writers
People from Harrisburg, Pennsylvania
Film directors from Pennsylvania
Screenwriters from Pennsylvania